Shashpur is a census town in Kalna II CD Block in Kalna subdivision of Purba Bardhaman district in the Indian state of West Bengal.

Geography

Location

Shashpur is also shown in the map of Kalna II CD block in the District Census Handbook.

Urbanisation
87.00% of the population of Kalna subdivision live in the rural areas. Only 13.00% of the population live in the urban areas. The map alongside presents some of the notable locations in the subdivision. All places marked in the map are linked in the larger full screen map.

Demographics
As per the 2011 Census of India, Shashpur had a total population of 10,100 of which 5,240 (52%) were males and 4,860 (48%) were females. Population below 6 years was 1,071. The total number of literates in  Shashpur was 6,598 (73.08% of the population over 6 years).

Infrastructure
As per the District Census Handbook 2011, Shashpur covered an area of 2.4249 km2. Amongst the medical facilities, the nearest nursing home was 22 km away and the nearest veterinary hospital was 22 km away. It had 4 medicine shops. It had 3 primary schools. Major educational facilities were available 1 km away at Kalna.

Note: There are major medical facilities at Kalna.

Transport
Shashpur is off State Highway 6. Ambika Kalna railway station is located nearby.

References

Cities and towns in Purba Bardhaman district